Una Vez Más Holdings, LLC was the owner of a group of low-power television stations, mostly in the Southwest, and was the largest Azteca América affiliate group in the United States. Based in Dallas, Texas, Una Vez Más (Spanish for One More Time) owned 31 low-power television stations in California, Nevada, Arizona, New Mexico, Texas and Florida, 25 of which are operational, and eleven of which are Class A television stations. Randy Nonberg was President and COO of Una Vez Mas, Terry Crosby was Chairman and CEO, and Nora Crosby was Vice-President of Operations.

On October 22, 2009; Una Vez Más has announced that it would be absorbing Johnson Broadcasting's portfolio after that broadcasting firm filed for Chapter 11 Bankruptcy. This included KLDT in Lake Dallas, Texas and KNWS-TV in Houston, Texas. The sale of these stations to Una Vez Más was approved by the bankruptcy court on December 29, 2009 and by the Federal Communications Commission on September 27. 2010. Una Vez Más officially took control of the two stations on December 29, 2010 and changed their affiliations to Azteca América and their call signs to KAZD and KYAZ, respectively. As a result, KAZD became the flagship of the company.

On July 28, 2011 High Plains Broadcasting announced plans to sell KFTY (now KEMO-TV) of Santa Rosa, California to Una Vez Más, with the intent to affiliate the station with Azteca América. In September 2011, the FCC approved the sale, with the station switching to Azteca América on September 29. At that time KEMO, along with KAZD and KYAZ were the only three full-service, full-power television stations owned by Una Vez Más.

It was announced on January 13, 2014 that Northstar Media (a subsidiary of Jericho Partners, LLC) has acquired Una Vez Mas' broadcast assets. UVM’s remaining non-broadcast operations were merged into Stations Group LLC, a wholly owned subsidiary of Azteca International Corporation. In turn Northstar Media was acquired by New York City-based HC2 Holdings in addition to the Azteca América network itself on November 29, 2017, making UVM/Northstar's former assets Azteca owned-and-operated stations.

Former television stations
These stations were owned by Una Vez mas prior to the Northstar media acquisition.

Stations formerly owned by UVM

References

External links

Una Vez Mas

Defunct television broadcasting companies of the United States
Companies based in Dallas